James Harrison Wilson Thompson (born 21 March 1906) was an American businessman who helped revitalise the Thai silk industry in the 1950s and 1960s. He co-founded the Thai Silk Company in 1948.

The son of a prominent Delaware family, Thompson graduated from Princeton University in 1928 and studied architecture at the University of Pennsylvania. From 1931 to 1940, he worked as an architect in New York City, designing homes for East Coast high society. In 1941, Thompson quit his job and enlisted with the Delaware National Guard, serving as an operative in the Office of Strategic Services (the forerunner of the Central Intelligence Agency) during World War II. After the war, he was assigned to the U.S. legation in Bangkok, Thailand. He embarked on his silk weaving career after leaving the military in 1946.

Disappearance
Thompson disappeared from Malaysia's Cameron Highlands while going for a walk on Sunday, 26 March 1967. Prior to his disappearance, he left Bangkok to spend a day in Penang with Mrs. Constance "Connie" Mangskau, his long-time acquaintance. On Friday, 24 March, they headed for the Highlands to holiday at the "Moonlight" bungalow (now the Jim Thompson cottage). Their hosts were Dr. Ling Tien Gi, a Singaporean-Chinese chemist, and Mrs. Helen Ling (née Dalling), his Caucasian American-born wife.

On Sunday, all four got up early to attend the morning services at All Souls’ Church. While the rest were preparing themselves for the service, Thompson informed them he would be taking a walk down Kamunting Road (Malay: Jalan Kamunting). This was the first time he was alone for approximately 20 minutes. Later, he met up with the others and they all drove on to church.

The Easter services lasted for more than an hour. When it ended at noon, the group returned to the "Moonlight" bungalow for lunch. At 1:30 pm, he left the bungalow for an afternoon stroll. Before leaving, he waved goodbye to Mrs. Ling and Mrs. Mangskau. They saw him depart the estate via the bungalow's only access road, Jalan Kamunting.

Thompson was in the Kamunting precinct for more than two hours. At around 4 pm, a cook from the Lutheran Mission bungalow saw him when he visited the chalet. He did not stay, but failed to return to the "Moonlight" bungalow before 6 pm.

An intense search was conducted after the police declared he was lost. More than 500 people were involved in the hunt. They included the army, the Malaysian police field force, Orang Asli trekkers, Gurkhas, reward hunters, tourists, residents, mystics, scouts, missionaries, adventure seekers, American school students and British servicemen convalescing at the resort. At the end of the hunt, Thompson was not to be found, and no clues were unearthed. The official search lasted for 11 days, and sporadic additional searching went on for months.

The case generated worldwide publicity and intense speculation, with most press reports and analysts contending that Thompson had been kidnapped (although no ransom note was forthcoming); had been murdered (although no body was ever found); had voluntarily left to do secret work in resolving the Vietnam War (although no evidence was presented); or was eliminated by business rivals (although no evidence on this emerged).

Recent information
One researcher believes the clue to Thompson's mystery may lie in some bone fragments that were found at the Cameron Highlands in 1985.

The remains, without the skull, were discovered by Orang Asli settlers in a grave at the edge of a vegetable plot off the main road in Brinchang.

Captain Philip J. Rivers, a master mariner, said he learned of the discovery from a health officer while researching Thompson's disappearance in 2007. The police collected the fragments but no connection was made to Thompson's disappearance in Tanah Rata, as they were found in Brinchang.

"The probability is that his body lay undiscovered in the thick under bush, hidden in an unmarked grave after a hit-and-run accident. A DNA test on the bones might possibly provide a fuller answer", said Rivers at a lecture organised by the Perak Academy in Ipoh, Perak, West Malaysia on 26 March 2010.

To date, there has been no confirmation that the bones belong to Thompson. According to Rivers, however, "the bones are presently kept in a safe and secure place".

Search-and-rescue analysis 
In 2015 an analysis, report and four news articles were done (by Llewellyn ("Lew") Toulmin; see ) of the 1967 search for Jim Thompson from a search and rescue (SAR) and scientific point of view.  This analysis drew on interviews with a leader of and participants in the search; on interviews with other actors; on principles and mathematical formulae developed by the US National Association for Search and Rescue (NASAR); on reviews of FBI, OSS, CIA and US Department of State material on the case and on Thompson; and on various other sources.

This analysis concluded that:

 The 1967 search delivered about 1448 person-days of searching, a substantial number, but likely not enough to cover all the  that were estimated in 1967 to be the target segment in the Cameron Highlands area.
 The "probability of success" (as defined by NASAR) of the 1967 search, calculated by the "probability of area" (likelihood that Thompson was in the searched segment vs. some other nearby segment) times the "probability of detection" (likelihood of finding the subject in the searched segment), was in the range of 43 to 30 percent or less, meaning that there was a fairly high chance that the search missed Thompson's body, if it was in fact present in the general search area.
 Various possible, likely or certain errors in search tactics and execution reduced the quality of the search effort, and the massive nature of the search made it almost certain (and even arguably provable mathematically) that just because it was the "biggest land search in Malaysian history", it was almost certainly not the "best search in Malaysian history".
 Three bloodhound-type dogs searched the Moonlight Bungalow (the "last known point" or LKP) for scent trails of Thompson, and did not find any going down the only access road or into the jungle. This led the Malaysian Police early on to conclude that Thompson left the area in a car, thus breaking the scent trail (this bloodhound search detailed information was not revealed previously); but this evidence is not conclusive.
 A possible sighting of Thompson in Tahiti took place several months after the disappearance, but this sighting is not certain.
 Remains called "the bones of Jim Thompson" did exist, in that some unknown bones were at one time in the Tanah Rata District Medical Office, but the bones were never proved to be human, were not probably connected to the Thompson case, and have since disappeared in an office move.
 Of the 25 possible causes for the disappearance cited by the press in 1967, about half can be eliminated as not credible.
 Of the eyewitnesses who may have seen Thompson after he left the LKP, two can be impeached as being too far (as measured on Google Earth) from Thompson to be credible, and the rest are of fairly low to very low credibility.

The Toulmin report concludes that the probability (but not certainty) is that Thompson's remains are still in the Cameron Highlands, and that a possible way to move the case forward is to use proven SAR techniques of detailed scenario development, "Mattson voting", and human remains detection (HRD) or "cadaver dogs".  Mattson voting is a standard SAR technique in which SAR field staff (and/or experts on a case) rank search segments (areas to be searched, developed in the scenario development phase) using a secret ballot, in priority order.  These individual rankings are then summed and the group results used to allocate SAR resources.

The Toulmin analysis also reviewed the brutal, still unsolved murder of Jim Thompson's sister in Chester County, Pennsylvania, just a few months after Thompson disappeared.  The analysis drew on an interview with the Pennsylvania State Police cold case officer; on a review of the wills and estate administrations of Thompson, his sister, and his sister's son; on interviews with neighbors and residents; and on contemporary (1967) news sources.  The analysis concluded there is no provable link between the Jim Thompson disappearance and the murder of his sister; that the two cases are unlikely to be related; and that several persons of interest (POIs) can be named but there is no proof against any of them.

The Toulmin report (see ) contains over 500 pages of primary source material on the Jim Thompson disappearance and the murder of his sister; this is the only such compilation available. The material includes CIA, OSS, FBI, and US Department of State material, maps of the search area, 200 pages of previously unpublished letters from Thompson to a former lover and fellow art collector, detailed interviews with various actors, photos and exact latitude and longitude of all the key locations (including possible witness locations), and other items.

See also

 List of people who disappeared
 Missing person

References

Notes

Books

Video
 
 
 Toulmin, Llewellyn (presenter at the Foreign Correspondents' Club of Thailand—FCCT) (September 2016) "The Exotic Life, Mysterious Disappearance and Massive Search for Jim Thompson, the 'Silk King of Thailand. https://www.youtube.com/watch?v=F3GNr08eawU

News articles
 
 
 
 
 
 
 
 
 
 
 
 
 Toulmin, Llewellyn ("Lew"). "The Exotic Life and Death of Thailand's 'Silk King, The Montgomery Sentinel (Montgomery County, Maryland), 7 May 2015, p. 19 (part 1 of a 4-part series).
 Toulmin, Llewellyn ("Lew"). "The Mysterious Disappearance and Search for Jim Thompson"  The Montgomery Sentinel (Montgomery County, Maryland), 4 June 2015, p. 16 (part 2 of a 4-part series).
 Toulmin, Llewellyn ("Lew"). "Continuing the Search for the 'Silk King The Montgomery Sentinel (Montgomery County, Maryland), 2 July 2015, p. 19 (part 3 of a 4-part series).
 Toulmin, Llewellyn ("Lew"). "The Last Stop in the Search for Jim Thompson",  The Montgomery Sentinel (Montgomery County, Maryland), 6 August 2015, p. 19 (part 4 of a 4-part series).
 Techakitteranum, Hathai. "A 50-Year Mystery: The Curious Case of Silk Tycoon Jim Thompson", DPA International press wire, http://www.dpa-international.com/topic/50-year-mystery-curious-case-silk-tycoon-jim-thompson-170322-99-757606  22 March 2017.

External links

 Jim Thompson, the Thai Silk King by Alessandro Pezzati
 Silk Thread: The Strange Mystery of Jim Thompson by Larry Wallace
 Tracking the Legend: My Search for Jim Thompson by Francine Matthews
 The Curious Case of Jim Thompson, Thai Silk King by Kenneth Champeon
 Solved! The disappearance of Jim Thompson in the Cameron Highlands by Edward Roy De Souza
 Solved! The "mysterious" disappearance of Jim Thompson in the Cameron Highlands www.YouTube.com
 Jim Thompson's staged disappearance in the Cameron Highlands www.TouTube.com
 Quotable quotes that point to the planned disappearance of Jim Thompson in the Cameron Highlands www.TouTube.com
 http://www.themosttraveled.com/new_land.html (Location of the Llewellyn ("Lew") Toulmin 2015 search and rescue pdf report, on a scientific SAR analysis of the 1967 search for Jim Thompson)

1960s missing person cases
1967 in Malaysia
Missing person cases in Malaysia
People declared dead in absentia
Year of death uncertain